The Wallace 1910 Fire Memorial, near Wallace, Idaho, was listed on the National Register of Historic Places in 1984.

It consists of two cobblestone monuments in the Nine Mile Cemetery, erected in 1921 by the United States Forest Service, with associated graves of firefighters who died in forest fires in 1910.

One commemorates five men who died at the West Fork of Placer Creek, fighting forest fires on August 20, 1910. The other commemorates six men who died at the Bullion Mine.

References

Firefighting memorials		
National Register of Historic Places in Shoshone County, Idaho
Buildings and structures completed in 1910